Abdulla Obaid Koni (born on 19 July 1979) is a Qatari former professional footballer of Senegalese descent who played as a defender for Al Sadd and naturalized to represent the Qatar national team. He also played for their youth national team.

Career
Koni was born in Senegal. He captained Al Sadd to victory in the AFC Champions League in 2011. In the round of 16 of the tournament, he scored a decisive header against Al Shabab which turned out to be the winner. His team went on to win the tournament, defeating Jeonbuk Hyundai Motors in the final in South Korea. As a result of the AFC Champions League triumph, he led his team into the 2011 FIFA Club World Cup. In the quarter-finals, he scored the winning goal against Espérance de Tunis slotting in a cross from teammate Lee Jung-Soo, earning his team a 2–1 victory. This set up a semi-final confrontation against Barcelona on 15 December 2011.

With Barcelona leading 1–0 in the 36th minute, Barcelona forward David Villa timed a run well and allowed for a ball to be played over the top into the path of his run. Villa and Koni raced toward the Al Sadd net. As the ball hit the ground, Villa failed to corral the ball, allowing Koni the time to catch up and challenge for the ball on its next bounce. He made a shoulder challenge on Villa as he attempted to strike the ball, causing Villa to fall awkwardly on his left leg and break it. Because of this, Koni was dubbed as "maybe the most influential player of the Euro 2012", even though Spain went on to win the tournament without Villa.

Career statistics

International goals 
Scores and results list Qatar's goal tally first, score column indicates score after each Koni goal.

Honours

Club
Al Sadd
 FIFA Club World Cup bronze medalist: 2011
 AFC Champions League: 2011
 Arab Champions League: 2001
 Qatari League: 1999–2000, 2003–04, 2005–06, 2006–07, 2012–13
 Emir of Qatar Cup: 2000, 2001, 2003, 2005, 2007
 Qatar Crown Prince Cup: 1998, 2003, 2006, 2007, 2008
 Sheikh Jassem Cup: 1998, 2000, 2002, 2007
 Qatari Stars Cup: 2010-11

References

External links
Player profile - doha-2006.com

1979 births
Living people
Qatari footballers
Qatar international footballers
Al Sadd SC players
2007 AFC Asian Cup players
Naturalised citizens of Qatar
Qatar Stars League players
Senegalese emigrants to Qatar
Qatari people of Senegalese descent
Asian Games medalists in football
Footballers at the 2006 Asian Games
Asian Games gold medalists for Qatar
Association football defenders
Medalists at the 2006 Asian Games